Martin Ferguson may refer to:

 Martin Ferguson (footballer) (born 1942), Scottish footballer
 Martin Ferguson (politician) (born 1953), Australian politician